Cioburciu (Chobruchi) is a village in the Slobozia District of Transnistria, Moldova. It has since 1990 been administered as a part of the breakaway Pridnestrovian Moldavian Republic (PMR).

Climate
Cioburciu has a humid continental climate (Köppen: Dfb)

References

Villages of Transnistria
Populated places on the Dniester
Slobozia District